Amanda Freitag (born May 11, 1972) is an American celebrity chef, and cookbook author. She is known for her frequent guest on Food Network television programs and work as a judge on the television cooking competitions. She is based in New York City.

Early life and education
Freitag was raised in Cedar Grove, New Jersey. She attended Cedar Grove High School, then known as Memorial High School, where her home economics teacher, Joan Levine, suggested that Freitag might be interested in attending the Culinary Institute of America (CIA). Freitag attended CIA at the Hyde Park location, graduating in 1989.

Restaurant career 
Following graduation in 1989, Freitag took a position at Vong New York working under chef Jean-Georges Vongerichten. In 1994, she left Vong to cook at Verbena, under chef Diane Forley. Freitag has stated that her time at Verbena was meaningful and she built important relationships, and where she first learned to focus on using local, organic ingredients. After Verbena, Freitag traveled to France and Italy, working for a short while at L'Arpège restaurant under chef Alain Passard in 1999.

In 2003, Freitag and restaurateur Godfrey Polistina opened the Upper West Side restaurant Cesca Enoteca & Trattoria. Freitag was chef de cuisine at Cesca, before moving to an executive chef position at The Harrison. On September 3, 2010, The New York Times reported that Freitag would be leaving the Harrison, and the restaurant's owner, Jimmy Bradley, will return as chef.

From January 2014 until July 2015, Freitag took over as executive chef of the Empire Diner in Manhattan, New York.

In September 2020, Freitag and Kevin Lillis’ Hospitality Alliance opened the bistro Rise & Thyme in Dallas, Texas.

Restaurants

Current 
 Rise & Thyme, Dallas (2020–present)

Former

Television appearances 
Since 2009, Freitag is a frequent judge on the culinary reality game show Chopped. 

In 2009, She battled Bobby Flay on Iron Chef America in “Battle: King Crab” (season 7, episode 10), with judges Keyshawn Johnson, Maggie Rodriguez, and Domenica Catelli. She narrowly lost, with a score of 49 against Flay's 50 points. The judging was evenly matched, with the exception of Freitag having earned one point fewer in the "taste" category.

Freitag competed in The Next Iron Chef Season 2, finishing in fourth place. Freitag stated she would continue as a judge on Chopped for the 2010 season and she returned for the season four episode "Against the Tide".

On the April 15, 2012 episode of Iron Chef America, Freitag appeared alongside Chopped Grand Champion Madison Cowan in "Battle: Kale", acting as Cowan's sous chef. She appeared as a contestant on season five of The Next Iron Chef. She lost to Alexandra Guarnaschelli in the finale on December 23.

On May 22, 2015, she and Ty Pennington began hosting the new Food Network series American Diner Revival, on which they make over diners' menus and interiors.

Publications

References

External links 
 
 

1972 births
Culinary Institute of America alumni
Food Network chefs
Women chefs
People from Cedar Grove, New Jersey
Living people